John Otto may refer to:

 John Otto (drummer) (born 1977), original member of the band Limp Bizkit
 John Otto (FBI acting director) (1938-2020), acting director of the FBI in 1987
 John Otto (park ranger) (1870–1952), first superintendent at Colorado National Monument
 John Otto (radio personality) (1929–1999), American radio talk show host
 John Otto (cyclist) (1900–1966), American Olympic cyclist
 John Otto (politician) (1948–2020), American politician
 John Conrad Otto (1774–1844), American physician